The Yaroinga (Yuruwinga) are an Aboriginal Australian people of the Northern Territory.

Country
Their northern limits were around Lake Nash. Westwards they were present at Barkly Downs, Mount Hogarth and Argadargada (now on the northern boundary of Manners Creek Station).

Language
They spoke the Ayerrerenge dialect (also known as Ayerrereng, Araynepenh, Yuruwinga, Bularnu and other variations), regarded as a variation of Andegerebinha, of the Upper Arrernte language group, and now extinct.

Social organization
The Yaroinga were divided into clans, some of whose names are recorded.
  Manda. A southern horde in the vicinity near Urandangi

Alternative names
 Jaroinga
 Yarroinga
 Yaringa (a creek name)
 Yorrawinga
 Yarrowin
 Jurangka/Yurangka (Iliaura exonym).
 Manda
 Pulanja. (language name)
 Bulanja, Bulanu

Notes

Citations

Sources

Aboriginal peoples of the Northern Territory